Mackenzie Boyd-Clowes (born 13 July 1991) is a Canadian ski jumper.

Career

2009: World Cup debut 
Mackenzie was raised in Calgary, Alberta, where he trained on the ski jumps at Canada Olympic Park. He made his world cup debut in 2009 in Vancouver, where he took 42nd place. He performed at FIS Nordic World Ski Championships 2009 in Liberec, Czech Republic, where he finished 46th at individual large hill event.

2010: First Olympics 
At his first and home 2010 Winter Olympics in Vancouver, he finished 44th in the individual normal hill, 36th in the individual large hill and 12th place at the large hill team event. He performed at FIS Nordic World Ski Championships 2011 in Oslo, Norway, where he finished 39th at individual large hill event.

2012: Ski flying world championships 
He performed at FIS Ski Flying World Championships 2012 in Vikersund, Norway, where he finished 36th at individual flying hill event.

2014: Second Olympics 
His best World Cup result is 9th place at ski flying individual event in Bad Mitterndorf in January 2014, in a discipline which he likes the most. At the 2014 Winter Olympics in Sochi, Russia, he finished 37th in the individual normal hill, 25th in the individual large hill and 12th place at the large hill team event.

2016: Return after break 
After one season break, he returned to the world cup in the 2015/16 season. He lives in Calgary, Alberta, Canada.

2018 Winter Olympics
Boyd-Clowes was named to his third Olympic team on January 24, 2018.

2022 Winter Olympics
In January 2022, Boyd-Clowes was named to Canada's 2022 Olympic team.

On February 7, Boyd-Clowes won the bronze medal as part of Canada's entry into the mixed team competition. This was Canada's first ever Olympic medal in the sport of ski jumping.

Major tournament results

Winter Olympics

FIS Nordic World Ski Championships

FIS Ski Flying World Championships

World Cup

Standings

Individual starts (167)

References

External links 
 
 
 
 

1991 births
Living people
Canadian male ski jumpers
Olympic ski jumpers of Canada
Ski jumpers at the 2010 Winter Olympics
Ski jumpers at the 2014 Winter Olympics
Ski jumpers at the 2018 Winter Olympics
Ski jumpers at the 2022 Winter Olympics
Skiers from Toronto
Olympic bronze medalists for Canada
Medalists at the 2022 Winter Olympics
Olympic medalists in ski jumping
Canadian expatriates in Slovenia